Billy Albert Kan Che-kin (born 1951/52) is a Hong Kong billionaire who is the chairman and chief executive officer of China LNG Group Limited (formerly Artel Solutions).

He was educated at Cotton College and graduated with a BSc in Mathematics from the University of East Anglia. A former executive at Deloitte and KPMG, he was awarded an honorary doctorate from the University of East Anglia in 2016.

Kan is married with two children and lives in Hong Kong.

References 

1950s births
Year of birth missing (living people)
Living people
Alumni of the University of East Anglia
Hong Kong billionaires
Hong Kong chief executives